WWNA (1340 AM, "Una 98.3") is a radio station licensed to serve Aguadilla, Puerto Rico.  The station is owned by Dominga Barreto Santiago, through licensee DBS Radio, Inc. It airs a Spanish Variety format.

The station was assigned the WWNA call letters by the Federal Communications Commission on September 24, 1999.

Ownership
In August 2004, Dominga Barreto Santiago reached an agreement to purchase WWNA from Aureo Matos for a reported sale price of $500,000. At the time of the sale, the station aired a Spanish-language Beautiful Music and Talk radio format. Barreto Santiago transferred WWNA's broadcast license to her wholly owned company DBS Radio, Inc. effective September 19, 2014.

Translator stations

Logos

References

External links
WWNA official website

WNA
Radio stations established in 1956
1956 establishments in Puerto Rico
WNA